Ryan Dotson (born November 22, 1972) is an American politician and pastor serving as a member of the Kentucky House of Representatives from the 73rd district. Elected in November 2020, he assumed office on January 1, 2021.

Career 
Dotson served as a radiologist in the United States Army. He has since worked as a senior pastor. He was elected to the Kentucky House of Representatives in November 2020 and assumed office on January 1, 2021.

In 2019, Dotson was scheduled to officiate the wedding of reality TV stars Jax Taylor and Brittany Cartwright. Dotson was later removed from the position after tweets resurfaced that were characterized as anti-LGBT and transphobic. In June 11, 2021, Dotson authored legislation that would ban transgender women from playing on women’s sports teams in Kentucky.

References

External links

Living people
1972 births
Republican Party members of the Kentucky House of Representatives
21st-century American politicians